Philopotinae is a subfamily of small-headed flies. Their larvae are endoparasites of araneomorph spiders in the subgroup Entelegynae.

Genera
The subfamily includes twelve extant genera and four extinct:
 Africaterphis Schlinger, 1968
 †Archaeterphis Hauser & Winterton, 2007
 Dimacrocolus Schlinger, 1961
 †Eulonchiella Meunier, 1912
 Helle Osten Sacken, 1896
 †Hoffeinsomyia Gillung & Winterton, 2017
 Megalybus Philippi, 1865
 Neophilopota Schlinger in Schlinger, Gillung & Borkent, 2013
 Oligoneura Bigot, 1878
 Parahelle Schlinger, 1961
 Philopota Wiedemann, 1830
 †Prophilopota Hennig, 1966
 Quasi Gillung & Winterton, 2011
 Schlingeriella Gillung & Winterton, 2011
 Terphis Erichson, 1840
 Thyllis Erichson, 1840

References

External links
Encyclopedia of Life entry

Brachycera subfamilies
Acroceridae
Taxa named by Ignaz Rudolph Schiner